Lin Chun-yi (born 26 September 1983) is a retired Taiwanese volleyball player who plays as an attacker in Chinese Taipei women's national volleyball team.

Playing history 
 Chung Shan Industrial and Commercial School
 Taipei Physical Education College

Awards

Individuals
 2005 Asian Club Championship "Best Blocker"

National team
 World University Games
 Winner: 2005

Clubs
 2005 Asian Club Championship -  Runner-Up, with Chung Shan

References

1983 births
Living people
Taiwanese women's volleyball players
Asian Games medalists in volleyball
Volleyball players at the 2006 Asian Games
Medalists at the 2006 Asian Games
Asian Games bronze medalists for Chinese Taipei